Celebrity Treasure Island 2021 is the 11th season overall, and the fifth celebrity season of the New Zealand reality-television series Treasure Island. After a break in 2020 due to the COVID-19 pandemic, the fifth edition of Celebrity Treasure Island was filmed in the summer of 2021 on an island off the coast of Ngātaki, in Northland, New Zealand, instead of the usual location, Fiji. The season premiered on 6 September, and airs weekly, Monday to Wednesday, at 7:30 PM on TVNZ 2. Matt Chisholm and Bree Tomasel returned as hosts. 21 new celebrity castaways take part on home soil, going head-to-head for the chance to win NZ$100,000 for their chosen charity.

Chris Parker was the sole Katipō member left, and the eventual winner, who took $100,000 for Rainbow Youth. Edna Swart and Lance Savali were the other two finalists. This season raised $215,000 across 13 various charities across Aotearoa.

Castaways
The 21 celebrities were initially separated into three tribes with te reo Māori names based on fauna of New Zealand: Honu (green sea turtle), Katipō (a spider) and Repo (stingray), including the merged tribe as Tohoraha (a Eubalaena australis whale).

Team Honu consisted of "The Legends" of sports and television, Team Katipō (a spider) are "The Jokers" and Team Repo consist of "The Bosses" known for their successful businesses. On Day 7 there was a tribal shuffle which left one person a minority in their new tribe. On Day 14, the winning captain was able to move a team member from Repo to Katipō. Final 8 merged as one after Day 20 elimination challenge. Day 25 was the first double elimination since the 2007 series. The final treasure hunt is located in Kapowairua.

Challenges

 
 The contestant was eliminated after their first time in the elimination challenge.
 The contestant was eliminated after their second time in the elimination challenge.
 The contestant was eliminated after their third time in the elimination challenge.
 The contestant was eliminated after the fourth or more time in the elimination challenge.

Episodes

See also
 Survivor NZ

References

External links

Official Instagram 
Official Podcasts 

TVNZ original programming
2021 New Zealand television seasons
New Zealand game shows
New Zealand reality television series
TVNZ 2 original programming
Television shows filmed in New Zealand
Television shows set in New Zealand